Nawab Abdul Samad Khan Bahadur (1861–1943) was the Nawab of Chhatari and Nawab of Talibnagar in the United Provinces of Agra and Oudh. He belonged to the Lalkhani family of Muslim Rajputs.

Early life
He selected trustee of the Old Party in Aligarh in 1909. He was nominated leading member of the Zamindars of the Province of Agra in 1917, the Chairman of Aligarh District Munincipal Board and a Special Magistrate with 2nd class powers in Tehsil Koil, Aligarh He was also one of the trustees of Muhammadan Anglo-Oriental College of Aligarh.

The Nawab had one son as Nawab Abdul Sami Khan and 3 daughters. He gave his daughters in marriage to his nephew Muhammad Ahmad Said Khan Chhatari and thus he is the ancestor of future Nawabs of Chhatari also.

Titles
 Khan Bahadur
 1913-22: Nawab of Talib Nagar, Nawab of Chhatri

References

1861 births
1943 deaths
People from Aligarh district
People from Uttar Pradesh
20th-century Indian Muslims
All India Muslim League members